SSTH Ocean Arrow is a super slender twin hull (SSTH) car ferry operating in Japan. Prof. Hideaki Miyata at Tokyo University developed the SSTH, a high-speed catamaran-hulled boat, as a joint work with IHI Corporation.

It entered service in 1998 between Kumamoto and Shimabara. The trip takes about 30 minutes, or about half the time that it had previously taken.

Despite their prevalence in Europe, previous attempts to bring a fast ferry to Japan had failed due to wake wash and wave damage in the Japanese coastal areas. In Ireland, a swimmer was drowned in one instance which was thought to be caused by wake wash from a fast-moving ferry.

References

External links
 
 
 
 

Ferries of Japan
IHI Corporation
1998 ships